Miss Venezuela 2011 was the 58th edition of the Miss Venezuela pageant held on October 15, 2011, at the Estudio 1 de Venevisión in Caracas, Venezuela. At the end of the event, outgoing titleholder Vanessa Gonçalves crowned Irene Esser of Sucre as her successor.

Results 
Color key

Special Awards

Official Contestants
24 candidates competed for the title.

Contestants Notes 
Irene Esser placed as 2nd runner-up in Miss Universe 2012 in Las Vegas, Nevada, USA.
Gabriella Ferrari unplaced in Miss World 2012 in Ordos, China PR. She also participated in Reinado Internacional del Café 2012 in Colombia, placing as 3rd runner-up.
Blanca Aljibes placed as semifinalist (Top 15) in Miss International 2012 in Okinawa, Japan.
Osmariel Villalobos placed as 2nd runner-Up (Miss Earth Water) in Miss Earth 2012 in Alabang, Muntinlupa, Philippines.
Angela Ramirez (Cojedes) won Miss Latinoamerica 2013 representing Región Andina Venezuela in Panama City, Panama.

Gala Interactiva de la Belleza (Interactive Beauty Gala) 
This preliminary event took place on September 17, 2011, at the Estudio 1 de Venevisión, co-hosted by Mariángel Ruiz and Winston Vallenilla. For the first time, the winners were elected by the audience on Twitter and Miss Venezuela web page. The following awards were given:

References

External links
Miss Venezuela Official Website

Miss Venezuela
2011 beauty pageants
2011 in Venezuela